The LT Cortesia class is a series of 8 container ships built for Conti Reederei and operated by Evergreen Marine. The ships were built by Samsung Heavy Industries in South Korea. The ships have a maximum theoretical capacity of around 8,084 twenty-foot equivalent units (TEU).

List of ships

References 

Container ship classes
Ships built by Samsung Heavy Industries